Waxtite, also WaxTite is the trade name of the heat-sealed waxed-paper packaging system that was used by Will Keith Kellogg in 1914, around the outside of their cereal boxes. Subsequently, the Waxtite packaging was moved inside the box.

References

Packaging materials